Gerry Wiedel (born 13 May 1933) is a Canadian épée and foil fencer. He competed at the 1968 and 1972 Summer Olympics.

References

1933 births
Living people
Canadian male épée fencers
Olympic fencers of Canada
Fencers at the 1968 Summer Olympics
Fencers at the 1972 Summer Olympics
People from Hildburghausen
Commonwealth Games medallists in fencing
Commonwealth Games bronze medallists for Canada
Fencers at the 1970 British Commonwealth Games
Canadian male foil fencers
Medallists at the 1970 British Commonwealth Games